John Bent (c. 1775 – 6 October 1848), of Weaton House, Devon and Oathall, Lindfield, Sussex  was an English Tory politician.

He was a Member (MP) for Sligo Borough from 1818 to 1820, and for Totnes from 1820 to 1826.

Alongside significant investments in property, Bent was also involved in the slave trade. He was heavily involved in the scandal of the Arigna Iron and Coal Mining Company towards the end of his parliamentary career.

References

1770s births
1848 deaths
People from Lindfield, West Sussex
Members of the Parliament of the United Kingdom for County Sligo constituencies (1801–1922)
UK MPs 1818–1820
Members of the Parliament of the United Kingdom for Totnes
UK MPs 1820–1826
Year of birth uncertain